Ghost Beside My Bed is a song written by Gregory Markel of the American progressive rock band Altered State, and was released on their 1991 debut album, Altered State. The song was released as the second single on Feb 2, 1992. The lyrics are based on an actual event experienced by vocalist Gregory Markel.

The song was produced by Tony Berg, and went #1 on Rock Radio in 1992 in several states in the U.S. In 2000, Lana Lane covered Ghost Beside My Bed on her Ballad Collection II album in 2000 and the Ballad Collection Special Edition.

Track listing

Personnel 
Gregory Markel – lead vocals, guitars 
Chip Moreland – drums  and vocals
Curtis Mathewson – lead guitar, bass guitar, keyboards and vocals

References

1992 singles
Altered State (band) songs
1992 songs